House of Soviets or House of the Soviets may refer to:

 House of Soviets (Kaliningrad), an incomplete building on the site of Königsberg Castle
 House of Soviets (Rostov-on-Don), a government building in Rostov-on-Don
 House of Soviets (Saint Petersburg), an office building
 House of the Soviets (Orenburg), headquarters of the government of Orenburg Oblast
 House of the Soviets (Veliky Novgorod), seat of the Novgorod Oblast Duma
 Budynok Rad (Kryvyi Rih Metrotram), an underground tram station in Kryvyi Rih, Ukraine
 Palace of the Soviets, a project to construct an administrative center and a congress hall in Moscow, Russia, near the Kremlin
 White House (Moscow), a government building in Moscow